Allobates fuscellus is a species of frog in the family Aromobatidae. It is found in the Amazon Basin in western Brazil and northeastern Peru, and it is expected to occur in adjacent Colombia and possibly northern Bolivia. Its natural habitats are tropical lowland primary and secondary rainforest. Eggs are laid on land, and the tadpoles are then carried by the parents to streams. It is threatened by habitat loss.

References

fuscellus
Amphibians of Brazil
Amphibians of Peru
Taxonomy articles created by Polbot
Amphibians described in 2002